House of Broken Love is a song by the American band Great White. Written by Mark Kendall, Michael Lardie and Alan Niven, the song was the eighth track on the band's album ...Twice Shy.

Charting 
It peaked at number 7 on the Billboard Mainstream Rock Tracks chart and number 83 on the Billboard Hot 100 chart.

Origin 
Great White's lead singer Jack Russell stated in an interview with the BBC's The Friday Rock Show that the song is about being alone. He had recently gone through a divorce and was with bandmate Mark Kendall—who had also recently broken up—when the band's manager walked in and said, "What is this, the house of broken love?"

Critical reception 
Linda Romine, of the Record-Journal, called the song a "Great White staple".

Notable performances 
The band played the song at the American Music Awards of 1990.

Charts

References 

1989 singles
Great White songs
Capitol Records singles
1989 songs